Cychropsis is a genus of ground beetles in the family Carabidae. There are more than 50 described species in Cychropsis, found in China and the Indian subcontinent.

Species
These 55 species belong to the genus Cychropsis:

 Cychropsis beatepuchnerae Kleinfeld & Puchner, 2007  (China)
 Cychropsis belzebuth Deuve & Mourzine, 2009  (China)
 Cychropsis bousqueti Deuve, 1991  (China)
 Cychropsis brezinai (Deuve, 1993)  (China)
 Cychropsis businskyi Deuve, 1992  (China)
 Cychropsis casalei (Cavazzuti, 1996)  (China)
 Cychropsis chuandongziensis Deuve, 2017  (China)
 Cychropsis conaensis Deuve & Tian, 2009  (China)
 Cychropsis coronata (Cavazzuti, 1996)  (China)
 Cychropsis cyanicollis Imura & Häckel, 2003  (China)
 Cychropsis dembickyi Imura, 2005  (the Indian subcontinent)
 Cychropsis deuvei Korell & Kleinfeld, 1987  (the Indian subcontinent)
 Cychropsis discoidicollis (Deuve, 2017)  (China)
 Cychropsis draconis Deuve, 1990  (China)
 Cychropsis dreuxi (Deuve, 2013)  (the Indian subcontinent)
 Cychropsis fuscotarsalis Deuve, 2003  (the Indian subcontinent)
 Cychropsis gigantea Deuve, 1992  (China)
 Cychropsis gongga Deuve & Vigna Taglianti, 1992  (China)
 Cychropsis gonggoides (Häckel & Sehnal, 2014)  (China)
 Cychropsis hartmanni Deuve & J.Schmidt, 2005  (the Indian subcontinent)
 Cychropsis helicophila (Deuve & Mourzine, 2009)  (China)
 Cychropsis huangcao (Häckel & Sehnal, 2014)  (China)
 Cychropsis infernalis Cavazzuti, 1996  (China)
 Cychropsis janataiana Deuve, 2007  (China)
 Cychropsis janetscheki Mandl, 1970  (the Indian subcontinent)
 Cychropsis jiabiensis Imura & Cavazzuti, 2019  (China)
 Cychropsis kabaki Imura & Häckel, 2003  (China)
 Cychropsis korelli Kleinfeld, 1999  (China)
 Cychropsis liangi (Deuve & Tian, 2013)  (China)
 Cychropsis lucifer Cavazzuti, 1996  (China)
 Cychropsis malacophila (Deuve & Mourzine, 2010)  (China)
 Cychropsis mandli Paulus, 1971  (the Indian subcontinent)
 Cychropsis maoniushana Imura & Cavazzuti, 2017  (China)
 Cychropsis martensi Heinz, 1994  (the Indian subcontinent)
 Cychropsis meihuanae (Imura, 1998)  (China)
 Cychropsis nagahatai Imura, 2004  (China)
 Cychropsis namchabarwana Imura, 1999  (China)
 Cychropsis nepalensis Mandl, 1965  (the Indian subcontinent)
 Cychropsis okamotoi (Imura & Su&Osawa, 1998)  (China)
 Cychropsis paramontana Sehnal & Häckel, 2006  (China)
 Cychropsis paramontanoides Imura & Cavazzuti, 2017  (China)
 Cychropsis poggii Cavazzuti, 2010  (China)
 Cychropsis shiva Deuve & J.Schmidt, 2010  (the Indian subcontinent)
 Cychropsis sikkimensis (Fairmaire, 1901)  (the Indian subcontinent)
 Cychropsis surkiensis Deuve, 2003  (the Indian subcontinent)
 Cychropsis tiani Deuve, 2011  (China)
 Cychropsis tigridentata Imura & Cavazzuti, 2017  (China)
 Cychropsis tryznai Häckel & Sehnal, 2007  (China)
 Cychropsis tuberculipennis Mandl, 1987  (the Indian subcontinent)
 Cychropsis weigeli Deuve & J.Schmidt, 2007  (the Indian subcontinent)
 Cychropsis weiperti Deuve & J.Schmidt, 2010  (the Indian subcontinent)
 Cychropsis weningeri Kleinfeld & Puchner, 2017  (China)
 Cychropsis wittmeri Mandl, 1975  (the Indian subcontinent)
 Cychropsis wittmeriana Deuve, 1983  (the Indian subcontinent)
 Cychropsis yuiana (Deuve & Tian, 2013)  (China)

References

 
Carabidae genera